The China Insurance Regulatory Commission (CIRC) was an agency of China authorized by the State Council to regulate the Chinese insurance products and services market and maintain legal and stable operations of insurance industry. It was founded on November 18, 1998, upgraded from a semi-ministerial to a ministerial institution in 2003, and currently has 31 local offices in every province.

On 17 March 2018, the 13th National People's Congress announced a plan to overhaul China's financial regulatory system. The China Insurance Regulatory Commission (CIRC), and the banking regulator, the China Banking Regulatory Commission (CBRC), were merged into the China Banking and Insurance Regulatory Commission (CBIRC) with an aim to resolve problems such as unclear responsibilities and cross-regulation. The CBIRC was officially established on 8 April 2018.

Functions
The main functions of the CIRC were:

Structure
Internal Setup of the CIRC is:

General Office
Development and Reform Department
Finance and Accounting Department
Property Insurance Regulatory Department
Personal Insurance Regulatory Department
Insurance Intermediaries Regulatory Department
Insurance Fund Management Regulatory Department
International Department
Legal Affairs Department
Statistics and IT Department
Local Offices Administration Department
Personnel and Education Department
Disciplinary Inspection Department

Funds
In September 2008, CIRC set up a nonprofit state-owned corporation China Insurance Security Fund Co., Ltd. with a registered capital of 100 million yuan to manage its insurance protection fund, amounting to at least 7 billion yuan (about US$1 billion).

Management 
The chief of the agency, Xiang Junbo, was appointed in October 2011 and has laid plans to introduce pricing and other market reforms.

In April 2017, the Central Commission for Discipline Inspection of the Communist Party of China announced online that Xiang was being investigated for suspected serious violation of the Party's code of conduct. In early September, Xiang was expelled from the CPC and dismissed from public office, the CCDI said.

See also
 China Securities Journal

References

External links

Government agencies of China
Financial regulatory authorities of China
Insurance in China
Government agencies established in 1998
1998 establishments in China
Regulation in China
Organizations based in Beijing
Insurance organizations
Insurance regulation
2018 disestablishments in China